Megaleranthis is a genus of flowering plants belonging to the family Ranunculaceae.

Species
Its native range is Korea.

Species:
 Megaleranthis saniculifolia Ohwi

References

Ranunculaceae
Ranunculaceae genera